John Charles Bridgfoot (28 September 1910 – 16 April 1946) was an Australian rules footballer who played with Footscray in the Victorian Football League (VFL).

Family
John Charles Bridgfoot, the son of Henry Francis Bridgfoot (1880-1931), and Mary Jenkins Bridgfoot (1886-1958), née Nicholson, was born at Benalla, Victoria on 28 September 1910.

He married Daphne Emily Tanner (1913-1999) in 1935. They had three sons: Geoffrey, Rodney, and Peter.

Football
Recruited from the Benalla Football Club in the Ovens & Murray Football League.

Death
He died at Preston, Victoria on 16 April 1946.

Notes

References
 
 Today's Sport in the Rain, The Herald, (Saturday, 27 July 1935), p.40.

External links 

1910 births
1946 deaths
Australian rules footballers from Victoria (Australia)
Western Bulldogs players
Benalla Football Club players